Godlington Manor is a historic home located at Chestertown, Kent County, Maryland, United States. It is a frame gambrel-roof structure with a long frame -story kitchen wing. The house features much of the original beaded clapboard. Also on the property is a frame milkhouse, a brick smokehouse, and a boxwood garden.

Godlington Manor was listed on the National Register of Historic Places in 1972.

References

External links

, including undated photo, at Maryland Historical Trust
Historic American Buildings Survey documentation, filed under Chestertown vicinity, Kent County, MD:

Houses on the National Register of Historic Places in Maryland
Historic American Buildings Survey in Maryland
Houses in Kent County, Maryland
National Register of Historic Places in Kent County, Maryland